The history of Gan Chinese, a variety of Chinese spoken in modern-day China, stretches back to the beginning of the Qin dynasty. This long stretch of time is divided into Old Gan, late Old Gan, and Middle Gan periods.

Old Gan
Old Gan (Song-gu Gon-ngi) or Proto-Gan (原始贛語, Ngien-si Gon-ngi) was spoken between the beginning of the Qin dynasty to the latter part of the Han dynasty.

In the year of 221 BC, General Tu Sui was sent on behalf of the Qin dynasty to the south of China in order to conquer the territory of Baiyue. 500,000 soldiers then settled down at Yugan, Nankang and three other places.  This formed the initial Chinese population in Jiangxi. In 202 BC, Yuzhang Prefecture was set up by the Han dynasty. Following this, the local population increased rapidly.

Late Old Gan
Late Old Gan (中古贛語, Zung-gu Gon-ngi) was spoken between the 3rd and 6th centuries. It was largely sinicized by new settlers from the Central Plain.  Some scholars consider late Old Gan, together with Hakka Chinese and the Tongtai dialect of Jianghuai Mandarin to have been the lingua franca of the Southern Dynasties.

However, late Old Gan was still distinctly different from the official language. History of Southern Dynasties records that

Middle Gan
Middle Gan (中世贛語, Zung-si Gon-ngi) is the variety of Gan spoken between the Tang and Song dynasties (from the 6th to the 13th century). The last time of large-scale settlement in Jiangxi by people from the Central Plain took place as a result of the An Lushan Rebellion. Gan also became stabilized following this period.

Research on the rhyming system of Jiangxi poets of this period has been made in order to reconstruct the linguistic form of Middle Gan. Scholars have found that modern Gan still keeps many linguistic characteristics of this historical layer.
For example,

rime 尤侯 corresponds to rime 蕭豪;
rime 支微 corresponds to rime 魚模;
rime 魚模 corresponds to rime 家麻;
rime 皆來 corresponds to rime 支微;
rime 監廉 corresponds to rime 寒先;
rime 庚青 corresponds to rime 江陽.

Late Middle Gan
Late Middle Gan (近世贛語, Qin-si Gon-ngi) was the form of Gan spoken between the Yuan and Ming dynasties (from the 13th to the 17th century).
Some linguistic characteristics of late Middle Gan are:
Semi-coronal  differentiates from alveolar stops 
Muddy consonants are merged with aspirated consonants
Syllable coda  merges into

Early Modern Gan
Early Modern Gan (近代贛語, Qin-tai Gon-ngi) was the form of Gan spoken from the Qing dynasty (17th century) up to the beginning of modern times.

The textbook Lei Zi Meng Qiu published in the middle of the 19th century has been used to understand the linguistic form of Nanchang dialect; scholars have found that Gan has stayed relatively stable from this time. For example, the nasal ending  merged into , and 7 tones were used.

Westerners also began to study Gan  during this period. British diplomatic official Edward Harper Parker was the first westerner to recorded Gan speech. He noticed his friend Wen-yuan of Fuzhou merged muddy consonants with aspirate consonants.

Bibles in some Gan dialects were also published at this time.

See also
Gan Swadesh list

References

Further reading
Chen Changyi, Summary of Gan's dialects
Li Jun and Chen Changfang, Characteristics of the rhyming, tonal system of Nanchang dialect of the middle 19th century (19世紀中葉南昌話韻母與聲調系統的特點)
Li Shali, On the rhyming system of Jiangxi poets of Ming dynasty
Liu Lunxin, On the history of Gan-Hakka
Laurent Sagart, Les dialectes Gan
Sagart, Laurent. 2002. Gan, Hakka and the Formation of Chinese Dialects. Dialect Variations in Chinese, 129–153. Papers from the Third International Conference on Sinology, Linguistics Section.
Shao Baiming and Ge Lili, The formation of Gan's dialects
Tian Yezheng, On the rhyming system of Jiangxi poets of Yuan dynasty
You Rujie, 西洋傳教士漢語方言學著作書目考述

Gan Chinese
Gan
History of Jiangxi